Adam Sørensen (born 11 November 2000) is a Danish professional footballer who plays as a left-back for Eliteserien club Bodø/Glimt.

Club career
Sørensen progressed through the Lyngby Boldklub youth academy after coming to the club from hometown side Herlev IF at U12 level. On 3 March 2018, he made his senior debut for the club in the Danish Superliga against Hobro IK at age 17 years and 116 days old, becoming the youngest player to debut for the club in the Superliga.

He suffered relegation to the Danish 1st Division with the club on 9 May 2021 after a loss to last placed AC Horsens. He was a starter during the 2021–22 campaign, in which Lyngby managed immediately to win promotion back to the Superliga. Sørensen finished the season with 35 total appearances in which he scored one goal.

On 12 January 2023, Sørensen was sold to Norwegian Eliteserien side FK Bodø/Glimt for a fee around 7,5 million DKK.

International career
On 23 August 2018, Sørensen was called up for the Denmark U19 team. He made his debut on 7 September, when he came on as a substitute at halftime for Lukas Klitten in a 2–1 win over Norway at an international tournament in Gävle, Sweden.

Career statistics

References

External links
 

Living people
2000 births
Danish men's footballers
Danish expatriate men's footballers
People from Herlev Municipality
Association football defenders
Denmark youth international footballers
Sportspeople from the Capital Region of Denmark
Herlev IF players
Lyngby Boldklub players
FK Bodø/Glimt players
Danish Superliga players
Danish 1st Division players
Danish expatriate sportspeople in Norway
Expatriate footballers in Norway